John Edward Zerzan (born August 10, 1943) is an American anarchist and primitivist ecophilosopher and author. His works criticize agricultural civilization as inherently oppressive, and advocates drawing upon the ways of life of hunter-gatherers as an inspiration for what a free society should look like. Subjects of his criticism include domestication, language, symbolic thought (such as mathematics and art) and the concept of time.

His six major books are Elements of Refusal (1988), Future Primitive and Other Essays (1994), Running on Emptiness (2002), Against Civilization: Readings and Reflections (2005), Twilight of the Machines (2008), and Why hope? The Stand Against Civilization (2015).

Early life and education 

Zerzan was born in Salem, Oregon, and is of Czech and Slovakian descent. He received his bachelor's degree in political science from Stanford University in 1966. From 1967 to 1970, Zerzan worked as a union organizer for the Social Service Employee's Union in San Francisco. Zerzan returned to school and received a master's degree in History from San Francisco State University in 1972. He completed his coursework towards a PhD at the University of Southern California but dropped out in 1975 before completing his dissertation.

Activism 

In 1966, Zerzan was arrested while performing civil disobedience at a Berkeley anti-Vietnam War march and spent two weeks in the Contra Costa County Jail. He vowed after his release never again to be willingly arrested. He attended events organized by Ken Kesey and the Merry Pranksters and was involved with the psychedelic drug and music scene in San Francisco's Haight-Ashbury neighborhood.

In the late 1960s he worked as a social worker for the city of San Francisco welfare department. He helped organize a social worker's union, the SSEU, and was elected vice president in 1968, and president in 1969. The local Situationist group Contradiction denounced him as a "leftist bureaucrat".

In 1974, Black and Red Press published Unions Against Revolution by Spanish ultra-left theorist Grandizo Munis that included an essay by Zerzan which previously appeared in the journal Telos.  Over the next 20 years, Zerzan became intimately involved with the Fifth Estate, Anarchy: A Journal of Desire Armed, Demolition Derby  and other anarchist periodicals. He began to question civilization in the early 80's, after having sought to confront issues around the neutrality of technology and division of labour, at the time when Fredy Perlman was making similar conclusions. He saw civilization itself as the root of the problems of the world and that a hunter-gatherer form of society presented the most egalitarian model for human relations with themselves and the natural world.

Zerzan became more widely known during the trial of Ted Kaczynski. After reading the Unabomber manifesto, Zerzan went to Colorado to experience the trial and meet with Kaczynski in-between proceedings. A New York Times reporter took interest in Zerzan's sympathies and published an interview that raised his national profile. Kaczynski eventually split from Zerzan and the anarcho-primitivists with the belief that leftist causes were a distraction.

In a 2014 interview, Zerzan stated that he and Kaczynski were "not on terms anymore." He criticized his former friend's 2008 essay "The Truth About Primitive Life: A Critique of Anarchoprimitivism" and expressed disapproval of Individuals Tending Towards the Wild, a Mexican group influenced by the Unabomber's bombing campaign.

Zerzan was associated with the Eugene, Oregon anarchist scene.

Thought 

Zerzan is an anarchist philosopher, and is broadly associated with the philosophies of anarcho-primitivism, green anarchism, anti-civilisation, post-left anarchy, neo-luddism, and in particular the critique of technology.

Criticism 

In his essay "Social Anarchism or Lifestyle Anarchism: An Unbridgeable Chasm", Murray Bookchin directed criticism from an anarchist point of view at Zerzan's anti-civilizational and anti-technological perspective. He argued that Zerzan's representation of hunter-gatherers was flawed, selective and often patronisingly racist, that his analysis was superficial, and that his practical proposals were nonsensical.

Aside from Bookchin, several other anarchist critiques of Zerzan's primitivist philosophies exist. The pamphlet, "Anarchism vs. Primitivism" by Brian Oliver Sheppard criticizes many aspects of the primitivist philosophy. It specifically rejects the claim that primitivism is a form of anarchism.

Some authors such as Andrew Flood have argued that destroying civilization would lead to the death of a significant majority of the population, mainly in poor countries. John Zerzan responded to such claims by suggesting a gradual decrease in population size, with the possibility of people having the need to seek means of sustainability more close to nature.

Flood suggests this contradicts Zerzan's claims elsewhere, and adds that, since it is certain that most people will strongly reject Zerzan's supposed utopia, it can only be implemented by authoritarian means, against the will of billions.

In his essay "Listen Anarchist!", Chaz Bufe criticized the primitivist position from an anarchist perspective, pointing out that primitivists are extremely vague about exactly which technologies they advocate keeping and which they seek to abolish, noting that smallpox had been eradicated thanks to medical technology.

Selected works

Books and pamphlets 
 When We Are Human: Notes From The Age Of Pandemics, July 2021.
 A People's History of Civilization, April 20, 2018
 Time and Time Again. Detritus Books, 2018.
 Why hope? The Stand Against Civilization. Feral House, 2015.
 Future Primitive Revisited. Feral House, May 2012.
 Origins of the 1%: The Bronze Age pamphlet. Left Bank Books, 2012.
 Origins: A John Zerzan Reader. Joint publication of FC Press and Black and Green Press, 2010.
 Twilight of the Machines. Feral House, 2008.
 Running On Emptiness. Feral House, 2002.
 Against Civilization (editor). Uncivilized Books, 1999; Expanded edition, Feral House, 2005.
 Future Primitive. Autonomedia, 1994.
 Questioning Technology (co-edited with Alice Carnes). Freedom Press, 1988; 2d edition, New Society, 1991, 
 Elements of Refusal. Left Bank Books, 1988; 2d edition, C.A.L. Press, 1999.

Articles 
 Telos 141, Second-Best Life: Real Virtuality.  New York: Telos Press Ltd., Winter 2007.
 Telos 137, Breaking the Spell: A Civilization Critique Perspective.  New York: Telos Press Ltd., Winter 2006.
 Telos 124, Why Primitivism?.  New York: Telos Press Ltd., Summer 2002.
 Telos 60, Taylorism and Unionism: The Origins of a Partnership.  New York: Telos Press Ltd., Summer 1984.
 Telos 50, Anti-Work and the Struggle for Control.  New York: Telos Press Ltd., Winter 1981–1982.
 Telos 49, Origins and Meaning of World War I.  New York: Telos Press Ltd., Fall 1981.
 Telos 28, Unionism and the Labor Front.  New York: Telos Press Ltd., Summer 1978.
 Telos 27, Unionization in America.  New York: Telos Press Ltd., Spring 1976.
 Telos 21, Organized Labor versus The Revolt Against Work: The Critical Contest.  New York: Telos Press Ltd., Fall 1974.

See also 
 Neotribalism
 Species Traitor, publication where John Zerzan regularly contributes
 Surplus, a Swedish movie (atmo, 2003) which contains an interview with John Zerzan

References

Further reading 
 "Radical rethinking" by Sena Christian. (April 17, 2008)

External links 

 
 
 Guide to John Zerzan's papers at the University of Oregon

1943 births
20th-century essayists
20th-century American male writers
20th-century American non-fiction writers
20th-century American philosophers
21st-century essayists
21st-century American male writers
21st-century American non-fiction writers
21st-century American philosophers
American anarchists
American anti–Vietnam War activists
American environmentalists
American ethicists
American male essayists
American male non-fiction writers
American people of Czech descent
Analytic philosophers
Anarchist theorists
Anarchist writers
Anarcho-primitivists
American anti-capitalists
Anti-consumerists
Critics of postmodernism
Critics of work and the work ethic
Ecophilosophers
Environmental philosophers
Environmental writers
Green anarchists
Green thinkers
Indigenous rights activists
Living people
Neo-Luddites
Philosophers of art
Philosophers of culture
Philosophers of history
Philosophers of science
Philosophers of technology
Philosophy writers
American social commentators
Social philosophers
University of Southern California alumni
Writers about activism and social change
Writers about globalization
Writers from Eugene, Oregon
Writers from Salem, Oregon